Bethany High is an ICSE and ISC affiliated school in Koramangala, Bangalore, India.

The director of the school is Dr. Akash Ryall.

Bethany High turned 50 in 2014 and opened up a new campus on Sarjapura Road, which was inaugurated by Mahatma Gandhi's granddaughter Sumitra Kulkarni.

Houses
There are four houses:
 Satur-Blue, motto "Steadfast and Sure"
 Darell-Red, motto "United in our strengths"
 Leonard-Yellow, motto "Honour at all cost"
 Mignon-Purple, motto "Abide by the truth"

Bethany Student Organisation
The Bethany Student Organisation is a body of students who have been chosen to represent their school and houses:
 The School President and Vice- President; both chosen from the Junior College.
 The School Head Boy and Head Girl; both chosen from Class 10.
The School Deputy Head Boy and Deputy Head Girl ;both chosen from Class 10
 The Cultural Coordinators, both chosen from the Junior College
 The Games Captain and Vice- Captain
 Four House Captains
 Four House Vice- Captains
 Four Prefects from each house (High School)
 Two Prefects from each house (Middle School)
 One Prefect from each house (Junior College)
 12 Literary Prefects (one each from High School, Middle School and Junior College representing their respective houses)

From 2019,the head Boy/girl and the House Captains and Vice Captains in the Sarjapur campus would be elected by the student population of the school/House. For the election of the Head Boy and Head Girl, a General election will be held whereas for the House Captains the  students from the respective House only can vote. The nominees are selected by the teachers with a vote and several debates.

References

High schools and secondary schools in Bangalore